Charlot is the son of Charlemagne in the Matter of France.

Charlot  may also refer to:

Charlot equation analytical chemistry equation regarding pH
Charlot (name)
Charlot River Airport, airport in Charlot River, Saskatchewan, Canada

See also

 Charlotte (disambiguation)